The 14th New Hampshire Infantry Regiment was an infantry regiment that participated in the American Civil War. It was the last three-year regiment raised in New Hampshire, serving from September 24, 1862, to July 8, 1865. Carroll Davidson Wright was one of its regimental leaders. The regiment lost a total of 232 men during its service; 8 officers and 63 enlisted men killed and mortally wounded, 4 officers and 151 enlisted men by disease.

History

On September 24, 1862, the regiment was organized and mustered in Concord, New Hampshire. In October 1862, the 14th NH arrived in Washington, D.C., where it camped on East Capitol Hill before establishing winter quarters at Poolesville, Maryland. From November 1862 to April 1863, the 14th NH served picket duty along the upper Potomac River. In April 1863, the regiment moved its quarters to Camp Adirondack, in northeast Washington D.C. From April 1863 to the end of the year, the 14th NH performed guard duty at Old Capitol Prison, transporting prisoners and deserters, and at the Navy Yard Bridge (Benning's Bridge). In early 1864, the 14th NH briefly performed picket duty in the Shenandoah Valley.

The regiment returned to New Hampshire to vote in the spring elections which were heavily contested. On March 16, 1864, the 14th N.H. departed for Louisiana to participate in the Red River Campaign, but arrived after it had ended. The regiment served at Camp Parapet, Carrollton, and Jefferson City until June 1864, when they returned to Virginia. The 14th served at Fortress Monroe and Berryville in Virginia until the end of July 1864. From August to December 1864, the regiment was part of General Sheridan's Army of the Shenandoah, and participated in the Third Battle of Winchester, on September 19, 1864, with heavy losses at the Battle of Fisher's Hill on September 22, 1864, and the Battle of Cedar Creek on October 19, 1864. Sergeant Major J. Henry Jenks, from Keene, New Hampshire, was the last man from this unit to fall in battle on October 19, 1864, in the Battle of Cedar Creek. At the conclusion of the Civil War, the 14th NH was stationed near Augusta and Savannah, Georgia. On July 8, 1865, the 14th New Hampshire Volunteer Regiment was mustered out in Savannah.

See also

List of New Hampshire Civil War Units

External links
NH State House Visitor's Center - Hall of Flags: Regiments
UNH Library - Milne Special Collections - John Henry Jenks Papers (MC 111)
UNH Library - Milne Special Collections - Daniel C. Currier, 1841-1905
USGNNET.org - Fourteenth New Hampshire Regiment Rosters

Further reading
 Waite, Otis F. R., New Hampshire in the Great Rebellion. Claremont, NH: Tracy, Chase & company, 1870.
 Buffum, Francis Henry. A Memorial of the Great Rebellion: Being a History of the Fourteenth Regiment New-Hampshire Volunteers, Covering Its Three Years of Service, with Original Sketches of Army Life. 1862-1865. Boston: Rand, Avery, & Co, 1882.

External links
 

14
1862 establishments in New Hampshire
Military units and formations established in 1862
Military units and formations disestablished in 1865